Austin Davis (born October 4, 1989) is an American politician who is the 35th lieutenant governor of Pennsylvania, since 2023. Prior to that, he served as a Democratic member of the Pennsylvania House of Representatives, representing the 35th District from 2018 to 2022.

Early life 
While in high school, Davis founded and served as Chairman of the Mayor's Youth Advisory Council under then McKeesport Mayor, James Brewster. After graduating from McKeesport Area High School, he attended the University of Pittsburgh at Greensburg where he earned a Bachelor of Arts degree in Political Science in 2012.

Political career 
While in college, Austin was hired as a legislative intern by the Pennsylvania House of Representatives.  At the age of 21, the Tribune Review called him "a veteran at the politics of helping others."

Davis previously served as executive assistant to Allegheny County Executive Rich Fitzgerald. In 2014, Davis became the youngest and the first black vice chair at the Allegheny County Democratic Committee.

Pennsylvania House of Representatives 

Davis ran for the Pennsylvania House of Representatives in the 35th district in a 2018 special election. Davis defeated Republican candidate Fawn Walker-Montgomery with over 73% of the vote and became the first African American to serve as State Representative for the district.

Committee assignments 
(2021-2022)
 Appropriations
 Consumer Affairs
 Insurance
 Transportation

Lieutenant gubernatorial campaign 

On December 14, 2021, it was reported that Davis would enter the 2022 race for Lieutenant Governor of Pennsylvania, after being selected by presumptive Democratic gubernatorial nominee Josh Shapiro to be his running mate. Pennsylvania law requires that a lieutenant gubernatorial candidate must run independent of the gubernatorial candidate in the primary.

On November 8, 2022, Shapiro and Davis handily defeated the Republican ticket of Doug Mastriano and Carrie DelRosso in the general election. Davis became the first African American to be elected lieutenant governor and the first millennial to win statewide office in Pennsylvania. Having been sworn in at age 33, he is youngest lieutenant governor in Pennsylvania history.

Personal life 
Davis met his wife, Blayre Holmes, at the August Wilson Center in 2012. The two were married September 1, 2017. They live in his lifelong hometown of McKeesport, Pennsylvania.

Davis has served on the board of directors of the YMCA of Greater Pittsburgh, The Consortium for Public Education, Communities in Schools of Pittsburgh, Auberle, Adonai Center for Black Males, Small Seeds Development, and the Urban League of Greater Pittsburgh Charter School.

Electoral history

See also 
 List of minority governors and lieutenant governors in the United States

References

External links

Lieutenant Governor Austin Davis official government website
Austin Davis for Lieutenant Governor campaign website

|-

|-

1989 births
21st-century African-American politicians
21st-century American politicians
African-American state legislators in Pennsylvania
Democratic Party members of the Pennsylvania House of Representatives
Lieutenant Governors of Pennsylvania
Living people
People from McKeesport, Pennsylvania
University of Pittsburgh alumni